Sabon Birni  is a Local Government Area in Sokoto State, Nigeria. Its headquarters are in the town of Sabon Birni.

Sabon Birni shares a border with the Republic of Niger to the north. It has an area of 2,354 km and a population of 207,599 at the 2006 census.

The postal code of the area is 842.

References

Local Government Areas in Sokoto State